Rule 42 (now Rule 5.1 and Rule 44 in the 2008 guide) is a rule of the Gaelic Athletic Association (GAA) which in practice prohibits the playing of non-Gaelic games in GAA stadiums. The rule is often mistakenly believed to prohibit foreign sports at GAA owned stadiums. However, non-Gaelic games such as boxing and American football did take place in Croke Park before Rule 42 was modified.

The drive to have Rule 42 changed
In the early 2000s the GAA came under pressure to allow non-Gaelic games be played in Croke Park so that the Football Association of Ireland could be joint hosts of Euro 2008. Subsequently, the association was asked to modify the rule so that the Ireland national rugby union team and Republic of Ireland national football team would not have to play their home games outside Ireland while the Lansdowne Road stadium was being redeveloped. A number of motions to change Rule 42 failed or were blocked from being put on the agenda with the majority of the opposition coming from the Ulster counties. The Rule was finally modified in 2005 to allow the playing of association football and rugby union in Croke Park only while Lansdowne Road was being redeveloped. The motion gave the GAA's central council the power to decide which games would be allowed in Croke Park. The motion to the GAA's annual congress passed 227–97, thus obtaining the two-thirds majority required.

When the redevelopment of Lansdowne Road is complete
It was agreed that once the redevelopment of Lansdowne Road (now called the Aviva Stadium) is complete Rule 42 will revert to its 2005 wording. However, high-profile GAA members including Seán Kelly, former GAA president, have expressed the view that the rule should not be reversed. On 17 April 2010 the GAA voted to keep Croke Park open after the redevelopment of Lansdowne Road.

Outside Croke Park
In addition to the opening of Croke Park to competing sports, local GAA units have sought to rent their facilities out to other sports organisations for financial reasons in violation of Rule 42. The continued existence of Rule 42 has proven to be controversial since the management of Croke Park has been allowed to earn revenue by renting the facility out to competing sports organisations, but local GAA units which own smaller facilities cannot. It is also said that it is questionable as to whether or not such rental deals would actually be damaging to the GAA's interests.

Wording of the rule
The original wording of Rule 42 is:

The 2005 amendment added the sentence:

The first games in Croke Park
The first game to take place under the relaxed Rule 42 took place on 11 February 2007.  It was a Six Nations Championship rugby union match between Ireland and France which Ireland lost 17–20. The following match against England generated some controversy, since it involved the playing of "God Save the Queen" at a ground where British soldiers had killed fourteen spectators on Bloody Sunday, 1920.
There was a small protest by Republican Sinn Féin outside the ground.  Ireland won the match by 43 points to 13.

A world record attendance
In early February 2009, with possibility of an all Irish semi-final in the 2008–09 Heineken Cup, the GAA confirmed that club rugby would also be allowed under the relaxing of Rule 42. The game was played in Croke Park on 2 May 2009, when Leinster defeated Munster 25–6. The attendance of 82,208 set a then world record attendance for a club rugby union game.

See also
 Rule 21
 List of non-Gaelic games played in Croke Park
 List of Gaelic Athletic Association stadiums
 Sport in Ireland

References

External links
 Rule 42 – the day Croke Park opened its doors to other sports

Gaelic Athletic Association terminology
Gaelic games controversies
42
History of the Gaelic Athletic Association